Francesco Allegrini da Gubbio (1587–1663) was an Italian painter of the Baroque period. His children, Flaminio and Angelica Allegrini, were also painters. Angelica painted a canvas for the church of San Francesco, Gubbio.

Biography
Born in Gubbio, he was also called Francesco da Gubbio. His father, Flaminio Allegrini da Cantiano, was also a painter. He studied under Giuseppe Cesari (Cavaliere D'Arpino), and later was helped by his sons in painting historical and religious paintings. A short biography is mentioned by Filippo Baldinucci.

He was admired as a battle painter. He was active in Rome, Genoa, Savona, and Naples. In Rome, he painted in the Vatican Loggias. He also painted in the church of San Marco, Rome, and the chapel of San Antonio in the church of Santi Cosma e Damiano. He painted for the Casa Durazzo in Genoa. In Savona he painted for the Palazzo Gavotti and the Savona Cathedral.

Sources

Angelica Allegrini

1587 births
1663 deaths
People from Gubbio
16th-century Italian painters
Italian male painters
17th-century Italian painters
Italian Baroque painters
Umbrian painters